Rhochmopterum antineura is a species of tephritid or fruit flies in the genus Rhochmopterum of the family Tephritidae.

Distribution
Zimbabwe.

References

Tephritinae
Insects described in 1935
Diptera of Africa